CD San Luis de Quillota is a Chilean football club based in Quillota that plays  in the Primera B. The club's home stadium is the Estadio Bicentenario Lucio Fariña.

History
The club was founded on December 8, 1919.

Honours
Primera B:
1955, 1958, 1980, 2014–15
Copa Apertura Segunda División:
1980
Tercera División:
2003

Players

Current squad

2021 Winter transfers

In

Out

References

External links

  
  San Luis at the ANFP official website

 
Association football clubs established in 1919
1919 establishments in Chile